The Gefion family (FIN: 516; adj. Gefionian; also known as Ceres family and Minerva family) is an asteroid family located in the intermediate asteroid belt between 2.74 and 2.82 AU at inclinations of 7.4° to 10.5°. The family of S-type asteroids is named after 1272 Gefion and consists of more than 2,500 known members. It had previously been known as the Ceres family. It is still known as Minerva family, named after then thought parent body 93 Minerva, until it was identified to be an interloper into its own family.

Properties 

The members have proper orbital elements in the approximate ranges

At the present epoch, the range of osculating orbital elements of these core members is

The namesake is 1272 Gefion. The family is fairly large, e.g. the Zappala 1995 analysis found about a hundred core members. A search of a recent proper element database found 766 objects (about 0.8% of the total) lying within the region defined by the first table above.

2631 Zhejiang has a diameter of 34 km, and is the largest core member whose diameter has been reliably estimated, although 2911 Miahelena is brighter, and would have a rough diameter of about 47 km, given the same (very low) albedo of 0.025.

Core members 

The core members identified by the Zappalà HCM method survey are shown in the table at right (minus interlopers).

Alternative name and interlopers 

Until recently, this family was known as the Ceres family (adj. Cererean) or the Minerva family (adj. Minervian) after 1 Ceres (the largest asteroid) or 93 Minerva. However, spectroscopic analyses showed that these largest members were in fact interlopers in their own family, having a different spectral class from the bulk of the members. Other known interlopers are 255 Oppavia, 374 Burgundia, 2507 Bobone, and 2559 Svoboda. This left the fairly minor asteroid 1272 Gefion as the lowest-numbered member.

List of members 

This is a list of the known family members, without the above-mentioned interlopers.

References 

Asteroid groups and families